Nicholas Baker (born 20 February 1957) is a Caymanian former cyclist. He competed in the team time trial at the 1988 Summer Olympics.

References

External links
 

1957 births
Living people
Caymanian male cyclists
Olympic cyclists of the Cayman Islands
Cyclists at the 1988 Summer Olympics
Place of birth missing (living people)